André Karnebeek (born March 1, 1971) is a retired Dutch professional football player.

Honours
Twente
KNVB Cup: 2000–01

References

1971 births
Living people
People from Hof van Twente
Dutch footballers
Eredivisie players
FC Twente players
Dutch expatriate footballers
Expatriate footballers in Scotland
Scottish Premier League players
Dunfermline Athletic F.C. players
De Graafschap players
Association football defenders
Dutch expatriate sportspeople in Scotland
Footballers from Overijssel